Proven oil reserves are those quantities of petroleum which, by analysis of geological and engineering data, can be estimated, with a high degree of confidence, to be commercially recoverable from a given date forward from known reservoirs and under current economic conditions.

Some statistics on this page are disputed and controversial—different sources (OPEC, CIA World Factbook, oil companies) give different figures. Some of the differences reflect different types of oil included. Different estimates may or may not include oil shale, mined oil sands or natural gas liquids.

Because proven reserves include oil recoverable under current economic conditions, nations may see large increases in proven reserves when known, but previously uneconomic deposits become economic to develop. In this way, Canada's proven reserves increased suddenly in 2003 when the oil sands of Alberta were seen to be economically viable. Similarly, Venezuela's proven reserves jumped in the late 2000s when the heavy oil of the Orinoco Belt was judged economic.

Sources
Sources sometimes differ on the volume of proven oil reserves. The differences sometimes result from different classes of oil included, and sometimes result from different definitions of proven.
[The data below does not seem to include shale oil and other "unconventional" sources of oil such as tar sands. For instance,  North America has over 3 trillion barrels of shale oil reserves,  and the majority of oil produced in the USA is from shale, leading to the paradoxical data below that the USA will finish all its oil at current production in 11 years,  because the production is mostly from shale but the reserves cited omit all shale reserves.]

Comparison of proven oil reserves from some widely used sources (billions of barrels, as of 31 Dec 2014)

Countries 

Reserves amounts are listed in millions of barrels.

* indicates "Oil reserves in COUNTRY or TERRITORY" or "Energy in COUNTRY or TERRITORY" links.

See also 
 List of countries by oil production
 List of countries by oil consumption
 List of countries by natural gas proven reserves

References 

Oil, proven
Reserves
List of countries by proven oil reserves
Lists of countries